Humphrys is a surname. Notable people with the surname include:

Bob Humphrys (1952–2008), BBC Wales sports broadcaster
Fletcher Humphrys (born 1976), Australian actor
Sir Francis Humphrys (1879–1971), British colonial administrator and diplomat
John Humphrys (born 1943), BBC broadcaster
Stephen Humphrys, English footballer
William Humphrys (1794–1865), engraver

See also
Humfrey, given name and surname
Humphery, surname
Humphrey, given name and surname
Humphreys (surname)
Humphry, surname
Humphries, surname

English-language surnames
Patronymic surnames
Surnames from given names